St. Augustine's Indian Residential School was a school in Sechelt, British Columbia, Canada, from 1904 to 1975, which was part of the Canadian Indian residential school system. Former pupils include actor Pat John who played in The Beachcombers for 19 years. The school was within  of the commercial centre of Sechelt, and was also known as Sechelt Residential School, Sechelt Industrial School and Our Lady of Lourdes.

History
In 1899 the Sechelt Indian Band had requested a school for their children but this had been refused; again in 1901 and 1903 the government had said that no action could be taken on a school.  Members of the band began to build the schoolhouse with room for 50 boys and girls in 1903, with the support of the Roman Catholic Bishop of New Westminster and Oblate missionaries. It opened on 28 July 1904, administered by the Roman Catholic church, and was funded by the Canadian government from 1905.

The school was managed by the Sisters of the lnstruction of the Child Jesus from 1904 to 1924, and members of that order held posts in the school until 1975. From 1924 to 1969 the Missionary Oblates of Mary Immaculate managed the school, and members of that order were also in post until 1975. The government took over the employment of teachers in 1954 and the management of the school in 1969.

There were 46 students enrolled in 1905, rising to 80 in 1922 and peaking at 153 in 1956; in 1975 there were 85 students.

The school building burned down on 29 May 1917; the school reopened in December 1918 and the new building was formally opened on 15 June 1922. In August 1923 the band sent a petition complaining of "poor education", "poor food" and "over-punishment", and the majority of the students did not return for the next term. In response a new, male, principal was appointed and the grant to the school was increased.

The school closed on 30 June 1975.

Student deaths
The National Centre for Truth and Reconciliation acknowledged the deaths of five students who attended the school. In 2021, in the light of discussion of Canadian Indian residential school gravesites and in particular deaths at Kamloops Indian Residential School, chief Warren Paull of the shíshálh First Nation said "As far as deaths go, I know that's not even close to the approximate number. They just weren't recorded." and chief Darren Blaney of the Homalco First Nation said in 2021 "There's a whole generation of Homalco people (who) didn't come home from that residential school ... They're buried somewhere in Sechelt." An investigation of the school site using ground penetrating radar began in February 2022.

Later use of site
The last remains of the school building were burned in 2008. The site is now occupied by the administrative and cultural centre of the shíshálh First Nation, including the tems swiya Museum and the Raven's Cry Theatre.

Notable former students
Pat John (1953-2022), actor in long-running television series The Beachcombers

References

Residential schools in British Columbia
Educational institutions established in 1903
Educational institutions disestablished in 1975